Andrew John Myers (born 3 November 1973) is an English football coach and former professional footballer who is a loan player technical coach at Premier League club Chelsea.

As a player, he was a defender notably in the Premier League with Chelsea and Bradford City. He also played in the Football League for Colchester United, Brentford and Portsmouth. He was capped by England at youth level. 

Since retirement, Myers has worked as a coach and returned to Chelsea in 2015 as a youth coach. He later had a spell as assistant manager of Eredivise club Vitesse before returning in 2017 to manage Chelsea's development squad.

Club career

Chelsea 
A product of the Chelsea Centre of Excellence, Myers made his bow in senior football with three first team appearances late in the 1990–91 First Division season and he was voted the club's Young Player of the Year. Myers signed his first professional contract in July 1991 and despite injury trouble and never featuring regularly, he would play for a further eight seasons as a professional for Chelsea and was a member of the 1996–97 FA Cup and 1997–98 UEFA Cup Winners' Cup-winning teams. After being made available for transfer, Myers departed Stamford Bridge in July 1999 and made 106 appearances and scored two goals for the club.

Bradford City 
On 16 July 1999, Myers joined Premier League club Bradford City on a four-year contract for an £800,000 fee. He missed most of the 1999–00 pre-season with a thigh strain and finally made his debut as a 66th-minute substitute for Wayne Jacobs in a 1–1 draw with Tottenham Hotspur on 12 September 1999. He then became the starting left back, but lost his place in the team to Lee Sharpe in October, due to suspension and illness. Myers returned to the team in November 1999 and featured regularly until mid-January 2000, when he suffered a groin injury. After returning to fitness, he departed on loan for the remainder of the 1999–00 season on 23 March 2000. He finished the season with just 16 appearances.

Myers began the 2000–01 season as a regular, making four appearances in Bradford's Intertoto Cup campaign and three Premier League appearances, before missing  months of the season with successive injuries. He returned to the struggling team in late November 2000 and thereafter managed to remain fit. Myers scored his first goal for the club with a crucial early header versus Everton on 28 April 2001, but two missed penalties deflated the Bantams and the team succumbed to a 2–1 defeat, which sealed the club's relegation to the First Division. In the penultimate game of the season and with Bradford 5–1 down in the West Yorkshire derby to Leeds United, Myers exchanged blows with captain Stuart McCall on the stroke of half time. Both players remained on the pitch and were fined two weeks' wages. Myers finished the 2000–01 season with 24 appearances and one goal.

Myers had his best season with Bradford in 2001–02, making 32 appearances and scoring two goals before suffering a hamstring injury in March 2002. He returned for two further appearances in April and was named the Bantams' Player of the Year. The club entered administration in May 2002 and Myers was one of 19 players made redundant, but he would remain at Valley Parade for the 2002–03 season. He made 25 appearances during a season in which Bradford narrowly avoided relegation and he was released in May 2003. In three seasons with the Bantams, Myers made 99 appearances and scored three goals.

Portsmouth (loan) 
On 23 March 2000, Myers joined First Division strugglers Portsmouth on loan until the end of the 1999–00 season. He made eight appearances and helped Pompey finish clear of the relegation places.

Colchester United 
After attention from First Division club Rotherham United, Myers signed a one-year contract with Second Division Colchester United on a free transfer. He made 26 appearances before his season was ended by a back injury in December 2003. Despite being invited back for the 2004–05 pre-season, Myers elected to leave the club in June 2004.

Brentford 
On 11 June 2004, Myers turned down an approach from Oxford United to sign a two-year contract with League One club Brentford on a free transfer. He made just 13 appearances during the 2004–05 season and was given a free transfer in May 2005.

International career 
Myers was capped by England at U20 and U21 level. He was a member of the England U20 squad at the 1993 FIFA World Youth Championship.

Coaching career 
Myers coached Old Isleworthians Youth in 2008. In 2011, he returned to Chelsea as U15 head coach and became assistant to U21 and U19 head coach Dermot Drummy in 2012. He spent the 2016–17 season as an assistant first team coach at Vitesse, before returning to Chelsea to take up the role as Development Squad head coach Joe Edwards' assistant. On 6 July 2018, it was announced that Myers had been appointed Chelsea U18 manager and one year later, he was promoted into the role of Development Squad head coach. During the curtailed 2019–20 season, which ended with the final standings being determined by points per game, Myers managed the team to the Premier League 2 First Division title. He moved into the role of loan player technical coach in May 2022.

Career statistics

Honours 
Chelsea
 FA Cup: 1996–97
 UEFA Cup Winners' Cup: 1997–98

Individual

 Chelsea Young Player of the Year: 1990–91
 Bradford City Player of the Year: 2001–02

References

External links

Andy Myers at TheFA.com
Andy Myers at chelseafc.com

1973 births
Living people
English footballers
England youth international footballers
England under-21 international footballers
Bradford City A.F.C. players
Brentford F.C. players
Chelsea F.C. players
Colchester United F.C. players
Portsmouth F.C. players
Premier League players
English Football League players
Chelsea F.C. non-playing staff
Association football fullbacks
Association football central defenders